The Border Whirlwind is a 1926 American silent Western film directed by John P. McCarthy and written by Enid Hibbard. The film stars Bob Custer, Sally Long, Josef Swickard, Wilbur Higby, Winifred Landis, and Philip Sleeman. The film was released on November 15, 1926, by Film Booking Offices of America.

Cast

References

External links

Lantern slide at worthpoint.com

1926 films
1926 Western (genre) films
American black-and-white films
Film Booking Offices of America films
Films directed by John P. McCarthy
Silent American Western (genre) films
1920s English-language films
1920s American films